The 2010 North Queensland Cowboys season was the 16th season in the club's history. Coached by Neil Henry and co-captained by Johnathan Thurston and Matthew Scott, they competed in the National Rugby League's 2010 Telstra Premiership, finishing in 15th place and failing to make the finals for the 3rd consecutive year.

Season summary 
Prior to the kick-off of the 2010 season, the media's attention surrounded the Cowboys' signing of ex-Australian international forward, Willie Mason on a one-year deal. The controversial figure was one of the team's most consistent players in 2010 but would leave the Cowboys at season's end to join English Super League side Hull Kingston Rovers.

2010 resulted in a very poor season for the Cowboys who recorded just five wins from 24 matches, although four of those wins came against teams that would participate in the 2010 finals series. Had the Melbourne Storm not been deducted premiership points for salary cap breaches earlier in the year, the Cowboys would have received the wooden spoon. During the season the side went on a three-game losing streak, two four-game losing streaks and ended the season on a run of six straight losses.

Highlights during the season included a golden point extra time victory over the Newcastle Knights in Round 20, in which rookie winger Will Tupou scored the match-winning try and the debuts of 18-year-old Michael Morgan and 17-year-old Jason Taumalolo, who would go on to play integral roles in the Cowboys' first Premiership win in 2015. Taumalolo was the youngest player to ever make his debut for the Cowboys.

The Cowboys' season of disappointment only got worse when Johnathan Thurston was arrested in Brisbane for drunk and disorderly behaviour during the off-season. His captaincy role at the Cowboys was under review, but no further action was taken. Furthermore, CEO Peter Parr was removed from his role and relegated to football operations manager.

During the off-season the club underwent a major overhaul of personnel, releasing 15 players and signing a number of new recruits for 2011, including Queensland and Australian representatives Dallas Johnson and Brent Tate.

Milestones 
 Round 1: Willie Mason made his debut for the club.
 Round 4: Leeson Ah Mau and Shannon Gallant made their debuts for the club.
 Round 4: Will Tupou made his NRL debut.
 Round 6: Carl Webb played his 100th game for the club.
 Round 7: Isaak Ah Mau made his debut for the club.
 Round 9: Matthew Bowen scored his 100th try for the club.
 Round 9: Dane Hogan and Michael Morgan made their NRL debuts.
 Round 16: John Williams played his 50th game for the club.
 Round 16: Arana Taumata made his debut for the club.
 Round 18: Scott Bolton played his 50th game for the club.
 Round 24: Jason Taumalolo made his NRL debut.
 Round 25: Matthew Scott played his 100th game for the club.
 Round 25: Ty Williams played his 150th game for the club.
 Round 26: Matthew Bowen played his 200th game for the club.

Squad List

Squad Movement

2010 Gains

2010 Losses

Ladder

Fixtures

Pre-season

Regular season

Statistics 

Source:

Representatives 
The following players have played a representative match in 2010

Honours

League 
 NYC Team of the Year: James Segeyaro

Club 
 Paul Bowman Medal: Matthew Scott
 Player's Player: Matthew Scott
 Club Person of the Year: Jeff Reibel
 Rookie of the Year: Leeson Ah Mau
 Most Improved: James Tamou
 NYC Player of the Year: Jason Taumalolo

Feeder Clubs

National Youth Competition 
  North Queensland Cowboys – 4th, lost semi final

Queensland Cup 
  Mackay Cutters – 6th, lost preliminary final
  Northern Pride – 4th, Premiers

References

External links 

North Queensland Cowboys seasons
North Queensland Cowboys season